Whitewright Independent School District is a public school district based in Whitewright, Texas, United States.  Located in southeastern Grayson County, the district extends into a small portion of western Fannin and northeastern Collin counties.

In 2009, the school district was rated "recognized" by the Texas Education Agency.

Schools
Whitewright High School (grades 9–12)
Whitewright Middle School (grades 6–8)
Whitewright Elementary School (grades PK-5)

References

External links
 

School districts in Grayson County, Texas
School districts in Fannin County, Texas
School districts in Collin County, Texas